Gonal is a village in the southern state of Karnataka, India. Administratively, Gonal is under Mangalore gram panchayat, Badami Taluka of Bagalkot District in Karnataka.   The village of Gonal is  6 km by road west of the village of Pattadakal and 17 km by road northeast of the town of Badami.

Notes

External links 
 

Villages in Bagalkot district